Robert Alfred Smith (22 February 1933 – 18 September 2010) was an English footballer who played as a centre-forward for Chelsea, Tottenham Hotspur, Brighton and Hove Albion and England. He finished as the First Division's top scorer in the 1957–58 season and he is Tottenham Hotspur's third-highest goal scorer with 208 goals.

Club career
Smith was born in Lingdale, North Riding of Yorkshire, and was spotted by Chelsea when playing for Redcar Boys' Club, where he had originally started out as a full back. He signed professional for the London club in 1950. He scored 23 League goals in 74 appearances, and seven FA Cup goals in twelve appearances. He was part of the 1954–55 Chelsea side that won the First Division, though he only made four appearances that season. Despite the fact he never really became established as a regular with Chelsea between 1950 and 1955, Tottenham Hotspur paid £18,000 for his transfer in December 1955.

Smith was an integral part of Bill Nicholson's famous double winning Tottenham team of 1960–61. He was Tottenham's top scorer in the double-winning season, with 33 goals scored in 43 games, including the first of the two goals in the 1961 FA Cup Final. The team also went on to retain the FA Cup in 1962 (scoring in the Final again) and win the 1963 UEFA Cup Winners' Cup. He is one of Spurs' all-time top goal scorers, third behind Harry Kane and Jimmy Greaves, with 208 goals scored in 317 senior matches, including 12 hat-tricks.

Smith played for Brighton & Hove Albion from 1964 to 1965, scoring 19 goals in 31 appearances.

International career
Smith won 15 full international caps for the England national team which included two goals in the 9–3 defeat of Scotland at Wembley in 1961. He played for England from 1960 to 1963, scoring 13 goals.

Post-playing career
Smith published a book in 2002 to celebrate his achievements, Memories of Spurs, with a foreword by Jimmy Greaves.

He died on 18 September 2010 following a short illness at a hospital in Enfield, London.

Honours
Tottenham Hotspur
Football League First Division: 1960–61
FA Cup: 1960–61, 1961–62
FA Community Shield: 1961, 1962
UEFA Cup Winners' Cup: 1962–63

Brighton & Hove Albion
Football League Fourth Division: 1964–65

References

External links
Bobby Smith's book 'My Memories of Spurs' 
FA Cup 1962 - matches, teams, report and photograph
Obituary of Bobby Smith, The Daily Telegraph, 22 September 2010

1933 births
People from Lingdale
2010 deaths
English footballers
England international footballers
Association football forwards
Brighton & Hove Albion F.C. players
Chelsea F.C. players
Tottenham Hotspur F.C. players
Hastings United F.C. (1948) players
1958 FIFA World Cup players
English Football League players
First Division/Premier League top scorers
London XI players
Footballers from North Yorkshire
FA Cup Final players